Grassholm is an island in Pembrokeshire, Wales.

Grassholm or Grass Holm may also refer to:

Grassholm, South Georgia, an island in South Georgia
Grass Holm, Orkney, an island off Gairsay in Scotland

See also
Grassholme, a village in County Durham, England